The British Colloquium for Theoretical Computer Science (BCTCS) is an organisation, founded in 1985, that represents the interests of Theoretical Computer Science in the UK, e.g. through representation on academic boards and providing commentary and evidence in response to consultations from public bodies. The BCTCS operates under the direction of an Organising Committee, with an Executive consisting of a President, Secretary and Treasurer. The current President is Barnaby Martin.

The purpose of BCTCS is:

 to provide a platform from which the interests and future well-being of British theoretical computer science may be advanced;
 to offer a forum in which UK-based researchers in all aspects of theoretical computer science can meet, present research findings, and discuss recent developments in the field; and
 to foster an environment within which PhD students undertaking research in theoretical computer science may gain experience in presenting their work in a formal arena, broaden their outlook on the subject, and benefit from contact with established researchers in the community.

In pursuit of these aims, the BCTCS organises an annual Conference for UK-based researchers in theoretical computer science. A central aspect of the annual BCTCS Conference is the training of PhD students. The scope of the annual BCTCS Conference includes all aspects of theoretical computer science, including algorithms, complexity, semantics, formal methods, concurrency, types, languages and logics.  An emphasis on breadth, together with the inherently mathematical nature of theoretical computer science, means that BCTCS always actively solicits both computer scientists and mathematicians as participants at its annual Conference, and offers an environment within which the two communities can meet and exchange ideas.

The Annual BCTCS Conference is primarily for the benefit of UK-based researchers.  However, to promote British theoretical computer science in the wider community, participants from outside of the UK are welcome to attend, and the programme of invited talks every year includes high-profile researchers from abroad.

Past officers of the BCTCS

Past presidents
 John V. Tucker (1985–1992)
 Alan Gibbons (1992–1998)
 Iain Stewart (1998–1999)
 Paul Dunne (1999–2001)
 Chris Tofts (2001–2004)
 Faron Moller (2004–2019)
 Barnaby Martin (2019-)

Past secretaries
 Mark Jerrum (1989–1992)
 Paul Dunne (1992–1999)
 Julian Bradfield (1999–2005)
 Graham Hutton (2005–2011)
 David Manlove (2011-2020)
 Michele Zito (2020-)

Past treasurers
 David Rydeheard (1989–1996)
 Chris Tofts (1996–2001)
 Faron Moller (2001–2004)
 Stephan Reiff-Marganiec (2004–2018)
 Matthew Hague (2018-2021)
 Olga Petrovska (2021-)

Past postgraduate representatives
 Savita Chauhan (1995-1997)
 Billy Duckworth (1997-1998)
 Richard Gault (1998-1999)
 Mei Lin Hui (1999-2000)
 Paul Sant (2000-2003)
 Corinna Elsenbroich (2003-2004)
 Vladimir Aleksic (2004-2005)
 Joel Wright (2005-2006)
 Joachim Baran (2006-2007)
 Temesghen Kahsai Azene (2007–2008)
 Haris Aziz (2008–2009)
 Julian Gutierrez (2009–2010)
 Radhakrishnan Delhibabu (2010–2011)
 Laurence E. Day (2011-2012)
 Andy Lawrence (2012-2013)
 Augustine Kwanashie (2013-2014)
 Pavan Sangha (2014-2015)
 Bram Geron (2015-2016)
 Thomas van Binsbergen (2016-2017)
 Frances Cooper (2017-2018)
 Sofiat Olaosebikan (2018-2019)
 Karl Southern (2019-2020)
 Filippos Pantekis (2020-2021)
 Michael McKay (2021-2022)
 Peace Ayegba (2022-)

BCTCS Conferences
1985 – BTCSC 1 – University of Leeds, 1-3 April 1985 (Organisers: John Tucker and Stan Wainer)

1986 – BTCSC 2 – University of Warwick, 24-26 March 1986 (Organisers: Meurig Beynon and Steve Matthews)

1987 – BCTCS 3 – University of Leicester, 13-15 April 1987 (Organiser: Derek Andrews)

1988 – BCTCS 4 – University of Edinburgh, 28-31 March 1988 (Organiser: Mark Jerrum)

1989 – BCTCS 5 – Royal Holloway and Bedford New College, 11-13 April 1989 (Organisers: Costas Iliopolous and John Shaw-Taylor)

1990 – BCTCS 6 – University of Manchester, 28-30 March 1990 (Organiser: David Rydeheard)

1991 – BCTCS 7 – University of Liverpool, 26-28 March 1991 (Organiser: Paul Dunne)

1992 – BCTCS 8 – University of Newcastle, 24-26 March 1992 (Organiser: Iain Stewart)

1993 – BCTCS 9 – University of York, 28-31 March 1993 (Organiser: Hussein Zedan)

1994 – BCTCS 10 – University of Bristol, 28-30 March 1994 (Organiser: Brian Stonebridge)

1995 – BCTCS 11 – University of Wales Swansea, 2-5 April 1995 (Organiser: Chris Tofts)

1996 – BCTCS 12 – University of Kent at Canterbury, 1-4 April 1996 (Organiser: Simon Thompson)

1997 – BCTCS 13 – University of Sheffield, 23-26 March 1997 (Organisers: Mike Holcombe and Matt Fairtlough)

1998 – BCTCS 14 – University of St. Andrews, 31 March – 2 April 1998 (Organiser: Tom Kelsey)

1999 – BCTCS 15 – Keele University 14-16th April 1999 (Organiser: John Stell)

2000 – BCTCS 16 – University of Liverpool 10-12th April 2000 (Organiser: Martyn Amos)

2001 – BCTCS 17 – University of Glasgow, 9-12th April 2001 (Organiser: Stephan Reiff-Marganiec)

2002 – BCTCS 18 – HP Laboratories Bristol, 7-10 April 2002 (Organiser: Chris Tofts)

2003 – BCTCS 19 – University of Leicester, 7-9 April 2003 (Organiser: Neil Ghani)

2004 – BCTCS 20 – University of Stirling, 5-8 April 2004 (Organiser: Stephan Reiff-Marganiec and Carron Shankland)

2005 – BCTCS 21 – University of Nottingham, 21-24 March 2005 (Organiser: Graham Hutton)

2006 – BCTCS 22 – Swansea University, 4-7 April 2006 (Organisers: Faron Moller and Markus Roggenbach)

2007 – BCTCS 23 – Oxford University, 2-5 April 2007 (Organisers: Sharon Curtis and Jeremy Gibbons)

2008 – BCTCS 24 – Durham University, 7-10 April 2008 (Organisers: Hajo Broersma, Tom Friedetzky and Daniel Paulusma)

2009 – BCTCS 25 – Warwick University, 6-9 April 2009 (Organisers: Artur Czumaj, Sara Kalvala and Steve Matthews)

2010 – BCTCS 26 – Edinburgh University, 6-9 April 2010 (Organisers: Julian Bradfield and Mary Cryan)

2011 – BCTCS 27 – Birmingham University, 18-21 April 2011 (Organisers: Achim Jung and Paul Levi)

2012 – BCTCS 28 – Manchester University, 2-5 April 2012 (Organiser: Ian Pratt-Hartmann)

2013 – BCTCS 29 – University of Bath, 24-27 March 2013 (Organisers: James Davenport, Guy McCusker)

2014 – BCTCS 30 – Loughborough University, 9-11 April 2014 (Organisers: Paul Bell and Daniel Reidenbach)

2015 – BCTCS 31 – Middlesex University, 14-18 September 2015 (Organisers: Barnaby Martin, Guiseppe Primero and Rajagopal Nagarajan)

2016 – BCTCS 32 – Queen’s University Belfast, 22-24 March 2016 (Organisers: Amitabh Trehan, Pooya Farshim, Peter Robinson and Alan Stewart)

2017 – BCTCS 33 – University of St Andrews, 26-28 April 2017 (Organiser: Markus Pfeiffer)

2018 – BCTCS 34 – Royal Holloway University of London, 26-28 March 2018 (Organiser: Matthew Hague)

2019 – BCTCS 35 – Durham University, 15-17 April 2019 (Organisers: Matthew Johnson, Barnaby Martin, George Mertzios and Daniël Paulusma.)

2020 – BCTCS 36 – Swansea University, 6-8 April 2020 (Organisers: Ulrich Berger, Faron Moller, Markus Roggenbach, Monika Seisenberger, Olga Petrovska and Liam O’Reilly)

2021 – BCTCS 37 – University of Liverpool, 29-31 March 2021 (Organisers: Patrick Totzke and Michele Zito)

2022 – BCTCS 38 – Swansea University, 11-13- April 2022 (Organisers: Monika Seisenberger and Olga Petrovska)

See also
 Formal Aspects of Computing Science, a British Computer Society Specialist Group.

External links
The British Colloquium for Theoretical Computer Science website

Computer science in the United Kingdom
Computer science organizations
Formal methods organizations
Organizations established in 1985
Learned societies of the United Kingdom
Science and technology in the United Kingdom
Theoretical computer science
1985 establishments in the United Kingdom